Ronald Spence (7 January 1927 – 24 April 1996) was an English footballer who played as a wing half.

Career
Born in Spennymoor, County Durham, Spence played for Tudhoe Colliery and Rossington Colliery before signing for York City in March 1948. He was a part of the team which played in the FA Cup semi-final in 1955. He joined non-League side Scarborough in June 1960, playing 42 appearances and scoring 10 goals in all competitions before playing for Goole Town. He returned to York as part-time trainer in July 1964, before taking the position full-time in November 1966. He then worked as physiotherapist and juniors' coach at the club from August 1972 to September 1975. Spence died in Doncaster Royal Infirmary at the age of 69 on 24 April 1996.

References

1927 births
People from Spennymoor
Footballers from County Durham
1996 deaths
English footballers
Association football wing halves
Rossington Main F.C. players
York City F.C. players
Scarborough F.C. players
Goole Town F.C. players
English Football League players
York City F.C. non-playing staff